Martin Høgsted (born in 1982, Dianalund) is a Danish stand-up comedian. He is known for UPS! Det er live, and as writer from Live fra Bremen. He debuted as  comedian  in 2006 on Comedy Zoo in Copenhagen and won DM i stand-up (Best Danish stand-up comedian) in 2008.

Filmography
UPS! Det er live (Oh! It's live)
Live fra Bremen (Live from Bremen)
Stand-up.dk
Mørk & Jul (Moerk and Jul)
Danish Dynamite

External links

References

1982 births
Danish stand-up comedians
Living people
People from Sorø Municipality